David Moir Nelson (April 29, 1920 – November 30, 1991) was an American football player, coach, college athletics administrator, author, and authority on college football playing rules.  He served as the head football coach at Hillsdale College (1946–1947), the University of Maine (1949–1950), and the University of Delaware (1951–1965), compiling a career record of 105–48–6.  During his 15 years as the head coach at Delaware, he tallied a mark of 84–42–2 and gained fame as the father of the Wing T offensive formation.  From 1951 to 1984, he served as Delaware's athletic director.  In 1957, Nelson was named to the National Collegiate Athletic Association Football Rules Committee and in 1962 became its Secretary-Editor, a position he held for 29 years until his death, the longest tenure in Rules Committee history. In this role, he edited the official college football rulebook and provided interpretations on how the playing rules were to be applied to game situations.  Nelson was inducted into the College Football Hall of Fame as a coach in 1987.

Early years and college
Nelson was born and raised in Detroit, Michigan.  Upon graduation from Northwestern High School in 1938, Nelson enrolled at the University of Michigan.  As a 5'7", 155-pound halfback, Nelson played football for Fritz Crisler in the same backfield with fellow Northwestern High alumnus Forest Evashevski, All-American fullback Bob Westfall, and 1940 Heisman Trophy winner Tom Harmon. All four members of this famed backfield have been inducted into the College Football Hall of Fame as either a player or as a coach.  In 1941, Nelson led the Wolverines in rushing, averaging 6.3 yards per carry.

Nelson earned a Bachelor of Science degree in 1942 before serving as a lieutenant in the United States Naval Air Corps during World War II.  He was awarded three battle stars for his service. After the war, Nelson returned to Michigan as assistant baseball coach, earning a Master of Science degree in 1946.

Coaching career
Nelson was head football coach at Hillsdale College in Michigan from 1946 to 1947, assistant football coach at Harvard University in 1948, and head football coach at the University of Maine from 1949 to 1950. While at Maine, Nelson began to develop the Wing-T formation.

When he took over at Delaware in 1951, Nelson continued to develop the Wing-T along with his assistant coach, Mike Lude, and eventual successor, Tubby Raymond, who joined the Delaware staff the fourth year of the Wing-T offense.  Delaware's success included winning the Lambert Cup, awarded to the top small-college team in the East, in 1959, 1962 and 1963. The 1963 team also finished the season as the top small college team in the nation in the United Press International poll. When Nelson retired from coaching after the 1965 season, his career record was 105–48–6.

Nelson's Wing-T formation was adopted by a number of other teams, including Evashevski's Iowa Hawkeyes, who won the Rose Bowl in 1957 and 1959 using the formation.  Others who used the Wing-T with success included Paul Dietzel with LSU, Frank Broyles with Arkansas, Ara Parseghian with Notre Dame, Jim Owens with Washington, and Eddie Robinson of Grambling State.

Nelson also brought a unique football helmet design to Delaware.  In the 1930s, Nelson's future college coach, Crisler, was the coach at Princeton University and was looking for a way to allow his quarterback to easily locate pass receivers running downfield.  At the time, there were no rules requiring schools to wear jerseys of contrasting colors, and helmets were dark leather, so distinguishing teammates from opponents at a glance was difficult.  Crisler hit upon the idea of a helmet with a winged pattern on it and had the leather dyed in Princeton's black and orange colors.  When Crisler moved to Michigan in 1938—the same year Nelson arrived—he used the same design with Michigan's school colors.  Nelson brought the same design, in the appropriate school colors, to Hillsdale, Maine, and Delaware. Delaware continues to use the "Michigan" helmet design to this day.

While at the University of Delaware, Nelson held numerous academic and administrative roles in addition to coaching. These positions include Associate Professor and Professor of Physical Education (1951-1990), Professor Emeritus (1990-1991), Director (1951-1984) and Dean (1981-1990) of Physical Education and Athletics and Recreation, as well as Special Assistant to the President (1989-1990).

Books and awards
Nelson authored a number of books on football, including Scoring Power with the Winged-T Offense (co-authored with Evashevski, 1957), The Modern Winged-T Playbook (with Evashevski, 1961), Football: Principles and Plays (1962), Championship Football by 12 Great Coaches (1962), Dave Nelson Selects 99 Best Plays for High School Football (1966), Dave Nelson Selects the Best of Defensive Football for High Schools (1967), and Illustrated Football Rules (1976).  Nelson's final book, The Anatomy of a Game: Football, the Rules, and the Men Who Made the Game, was a year-by-year chronicle of how the collegiate football playing rules evolved from 1876 to 1991. It was published posthumously in 1994.

Nelson's awards include the National Football Foundation Distinguished American Award (1984) and the American Football Coaches Association's Amos Alonzo Stagg Award (1989).  He was inducted into the Delaware Sports Museum and Hall of Fame in 1978, the University of Michigan Athletic Hall of Honor in 1986, and the College Football Hall of Fame in 1987 for his coaching achievements. 

Nelson's papers are held in Special Collections at the University of Delaware.

Head coaching record

References

External links
 David M. Nelson papers, Special Collections, University of Delaware Library, Newark, Delaware.
 

1920 births
1991 deaths
20th-century American non-fiction writers
American football halfbacks
American sportswriters
College football announcers
Delaware Fightin' Blue Hens athletic directors
Delaware Fightin' Blue Hens football coaches
Harvard Crimson football coaches
Hillsdale Chargers football coaches
Maine Black Bears football coaches
Michigan Wolverines baseball coaches
Michigan Wolverines baseball players
Michigan Wolverines football players
Yankee Conference commissioners
United States Navy personnel of World War II
United States Navy officers
College Football Hall of Fame inductees
Northwestern High School (Michigan) alumni
Coaches of American football from Michigan
Players of American football from Detroit
Baseball players from Detroit